"The Three Strangers" is a short story by Thomas Hardy from 1883.

Background
The story is a pastoral history told by an omniscient narrator more than 50 years after the event. The sheep-stealer is a kind of folk hero who stole to survive and escaped by outsmarting his hangman.
 
Casterbridge was the name for Dorchester in Thomas Hardy's Wessex.

Publication
"The Three Strangers" was published in Longman's Magazine and Harper's Weekly in March 1883. Five years later it became the first of five stories in Hardy's Wessex Tales.

References

External links
 

Works by Thomas Hardy
1883 short stories
Works originally published in Harper's Magazine